Blonde for a Day is a 1946 American action film directed by Sam Newfield and written by Fred Myton. The film stars Hugh Beaumont, Kathryn Adams, Cy Kendall,  Richard Fraser, Paul Bryar, Mauritz Hugo and Charles C. Wilson. The film was released on June 10, 1946, by Producers Releasing Corporation.

Plot

Cast       
Hugh Beaumont as Michael Shayne
Kathryn Adams as Phyllis Hamilton
Cy Kendall as Pete Rafferty
Marjorie Hoshelle as Helen Porter
Richard Fraser as Dillingham 'Dilly' Smith
Paul Bryar as Tim Rourke
Mauritz Hugo as Hank Brenner
Charles C. Wilson as Will Gentry
Sonia Sorel as Muriel Bronson
Frank Ferguson as Walter Bronson
Claire Rochelle as Minerva Dickens

References

External links
 

1946 films
1940s English-language films
American crime action films
1940s crime action films
Producers Releasing Corporation films
Films directed by Sam Newfield
American black-and-white films
1940s American films